Szymankowo is a village in the administrative district of Gmina Lichnowy, within Malbork County, Pomeranian Voivodeship, in northern Poland. The village has a population of 744.

History
Before 1772 the area was part of Kingdom of Poland, from 1772 to 1871 to the Prussia, from 1871 to 1919 to Germany, from 1920 to 1939 to Free City of Danzig, from 1939 to 1945 to Nazi Germany, and in 1945, it was returned to Poland.

World War II
In interwar period Szymankowo was on a territory of Free City of Danzig. Hours before the German invasion of Poland and World War II, on September 1, 1939, the Germans sent two trains with soldiers to capture bridges at Tczew, disguised as freight trains.  Polish railroaders on Szymankowo station directed the first train to a blind track, halting the assault. In revenge, local Germans SA units murdered 23 Poles, railmen, customs officers and their families, including one pregnant woman, at the local train station.

References

Szymankowo